James Lott Hull (November 27, 1873 – July 25, 1928) was a fireman first class serving in the United States Navy during the Spanish–American War who received the Medal of Honor for bravery.

Biography
Hull was born November 27, 1873, in Patoka, Illinois, and after entering the navy was sent to fight in the Spanish–American War aboard the USS Concord as a fireman first class.

He died on July 25, 1928, and is buried in Haven Hill Cemetery Olney, Illinois.

Medal of Honor citation
Rank and organization: Fireman First Class, U.S. Navy. Born: 27 November 1873, Patoka, Ill. Accredited to: Illinois. G.O. No.: 502, 14 December 1898.

Citation:

On board the U.S.S. Concord off Cavite, Manila Bay, Philippine Islands, 21 May 1898. Following the blowing out of a lower manhole plate joint on boiler B of that vessel, Hull assisted in hauling the fires in the hot, vapor-filled atmosphere, which necessitated the playing of water into the fireroom from a hose.

See also

List of Medal of Honor recipients for the Spanish–American War

References

External links

1873 births
1928 deaths
United States Navy Medal of Honor recipients
United States Navy sailors
American military personnel of the Spanish–American War
People from Marion County, Illinois
Military personnel from Illinois
Spanish–American War recipients of the Medal of Honor